Šišatovac is a village located in the municipality of Sremska Mitrovica, Serbia. The village has a Serb ethnic majority and its population numbers 211 people (as of 2011). Near the village is the Šišatovac monastery, one of 16 Serbian Orthodox monasteries on Fruška Gora mountain.

Historical population

 Year:Population
 1961: 281
 1971: 239
 1981: 237
 1991: 217
 2002: 218
 2011: 211

See also
 List of places in Serbia
 List of cities, towns and villages in Vojvodina

References

 Slobodan Ćurčić, Broj stanovnika Vojvodine, Novi Sad, 1996.

Populated places in Syrmia
Sremska Mitrovica